Larry Melvin Masinter is an early internet pioneer and ACM Fellow. After attending Stanford University, he became a Principal Scientist of Xerox Artificial Intelligence Systems and author or coauthor of 26 of the Internet Engineering Task Force's Requests for Comments.

Masinter, who was raised in San Antonio, Texas, is now retired, with wife Carol Masinter, and working on projects for fellow Parkinsons patients.

Stanford
Masinter received his PhD from Stanford University in 1980, writing a dissertation on "Global Program Analysis in an Interactive Environment." His advisor was Terry Winograd.

Masinter then worked on the PDP-10 version of Lisp and worked with Bill van Melle on Common Lisp.

Xerox PARC
Masinter went to work for Xerox PARC in 1976. In 1981, Warren Teitelman and Masinter published a paper on Interlisp in IEEE Computer.

Masinter documented the failed attempt in 1982 to port Interlisp to the Berkeley Software Distribution (BSD) Unix on the VAX. This led to the initial Interlisp IDEs, for which Masinter was initially known.

Masinter later helped develop the URL standard, along with Mark McCahill and Tim Berners-Lee.

While at the Xerox Palo Alto Research Center in the 1980s, he began working on online document formats and accessibility options and helped define many of the standards used today. In 1992, an Association for Computing Machinery (ACM) Software System Award recognized the team of Daniel G. Bobrow, Richard R. Burton, L. Peter Deutsch, Ronald Kaplan, Larry Masinter, Warren Teitelman for their work on Interlisp. Masinter became an ACM fellow in 1999 for his work on Interlisp and creation of World Wide Web standards.

Adobe
After Xerox, Masinter worked at AT&T Labs and Adobe for 18 years, doing pioneering work on document management and location technologies. He helped publish the PDF MIME type. At Adobe, Masinter was highly active in documenting a number of internet standards and contributed to a number of peer-reviewed journals. His work allowed tools such as Apache to integrate MIME seamlessly.

Masinter presented at the University of California, Irvine TWIST conference. He also collaborated with Nick Kew on the book The Apache Modules Book: Application Development with Apache and with Kim H. Veltman on her book, Understanding New Media: Augmented Knowledge & Culture.

Internet Engineering Task Force RFCs
Masinter was involved with the IETF, helping to set standards from 1994 to 2017 primarily in URIs and HTTP. His contributions include the following:

  Functional Requirements for Uniform Resource Names (K. Sollins, L. Masinter)
  Uniform Resource Locators (URL) (T. Berners-Lee, L. Masinter, M. McCahill)
  Form-based File Upload in HTML (E. Nebel, L. Masinter)
  Hyper Text Coffee Pot Control Protocol (HTCPCP/1.0) (L. Masinter)
  The mailto URL scheme (P. Hoffman, L. Masinter, J. Zawinski)
  Returning Values from Forms: multipart/form-data (L. Masinter)
  Uniform Resource Identifiers (URI): Generic Syntax (T. Berners-Lee, R. Fielding, L. Masinter)
  The "data" URL scheme (L. Masinter)
  Extended Facsimile Using Internet Mail (L. Masinter, D. Wing)
  Media Features for Display, Print, and Fax (L. Masinter, D. Wing, A. Mutz, K. Holtman)
  Terminology and Goals for Internet Fax (L. Masinter)
  Hypertext Transfer Protocol—HTTP/1.1 (R. Fielding, J. Gettys, J. Mogul, H. Frystyk, L. Masinter, P. Leach, T. Berners-Lee)
  Guidelines for new URL Schemes (L. Masinter, H. Alvestrand, D. Zigmond, R. Petke)
  Format for Literal IPv6 Addresses in URL's (R. Hinden, B. Carpenter, L. Masinter)
  The 'text/html' Media Type (D. Connolly, L. Masinter)
  Identifying Composite Media Features (G. Klyne, L. Masinter)
  Context and Goals for Common Name Resolution (N. Popp, M. Mealling, L. Masinter, K. Sollins)
  Guidelines for the Use of Extensible Markup Language (XML) within IETF Protocols (S. Hollenbeck, M. Rose, L. Masinter)
  An IETF URN Sub-namespace for Registered Protocol Parameters (M. Mealling, L. Masinter, T. Hardie, G. Klyne)
  The application/pdf Media Type (E. Taft, J. Pravetz, S. Zilles, L. Masinter)
  Uniform Resource Identifier (URI): Generic Syntax (T. Berners-Lee, R. Fielding, L. Masinter)
  Guidelines and Registration Procedures for New URI Schemes (T. Hansen, T. Hardie, L. Masinter)
  The 'mailto' URI Scheme (M. Duerst, L. Masinter, J. Zawinski)
  Returning Values from Forms: multipart/form-data (L. Masinter)
  PDF Format for RFCs (L. Masinter)

References

External links 

 

Year of birth missing (living people)
Internet pioneers
Living people